James Stewart Hunter Morrison (born October 11, 1931) is a Canadian former professional ice hockey defenceman, coach and scout. He played in the National Hockey League for the Boston Bruins, Toronto Maple Leafs, Detroit Red Wings, New York Rangers and Pittsburgh Penguins between 1951 and 1961, and again from 1969 to 1971. He also played in the minor American Hockey League during his career, which lasted from 1951 to 1973. A fast skating, offensive minded defenseman, he would score many goals and assists during his career, a rarity for a blueliner.

Morrison also played eight seasons with the Quebec Aces and three season with the Baltimore Clippers in the American Hockey League. Morrison won the Eddie Shore Award in 1965–66 as the league's outstanding defenceman.

After his retirement he briefly coached the Kitchener Rangers before moving behind the bench of the Kingston Canadians (later Kingston Frontenacs) for seven seasons. He later served 18 years as a scout in the Bruins organization before being forced into retirement. Dave Morrison is the son of Jim.

Career statistics

Regular season and playoffs

External links

1931 births
Living people
Baltimore Clippers players
Barrie Flyers players
Boston Bruins players
Boston Bruins scouts
Canadian ice hockey defencemen
Detroit Red Wings players
Hershey Bears players
Ice hockey people from Montreal
Kingston Canadians coaches
Kitchener Rangers coaches
New York Rangers players
Pittsburgh Hornets players
Pittsburgh Penguins players
Quebec Aces (AHL) players
Toronto Maple Leafs players